Old Karimganj, also spelled as Old Kareemganj or simply Karimganj, is a residential neighborhood under the Civil Lines thana zone of Gaya, Bihar, India, inhabited mostly by Muslims. Forming the eastern wing of the larger Karimganj neighborhood, it shares its proximity with New Karimganj neighborhood to the west and Jagdeo Nagar to the north. The locality is popular for serving the Karimganj Cemetery and infamous for its congested alleyways and poor drainage infrastructure.

Etymology 
Old Karimganj is the literal translation of Hindi-Urdu Purānī Karīmganj. The Hindi-Urdu purānī (Hindi: पुरानी;) literally means "old" meanwhile the Arabic word karīm translates to "kind" or "noble" whereas the Middle Persian word ganj means "treasured place" or "neighborhood".

Notable landmarks 

 Old Karimganj Cemetery 

 Nazareth Academy

References 

Gaya district
Neighbourhoods in Bihar